Norfolk and Western 1218 is a preserved four-cylinder simple articulated 2-6-6-4 steam locomotive, built in June 1943 by the Norfolk and Western's (N&W) East End Shops in Roanoke, Virginia as part of the N&W's class "A" fleet of fast freight locomotives. It was retired from regular revenue service in July 1959, and was later restored by Norfolk Southern for excursion service for their steam program, pulling excursions throughout the eastern United States from 1987 to 1991. It is currently on display at the Virginia Museum of Transportation in Roanoke, Virginia.

Historic significance 
No. 1218 is the sole survivor of the Norfolk and Western's class A locomotives and the only surviving 2-6-6-4 steam locomotive in the world.  While smaller than Union Pacific's famous and more numerous "Challenger" class of 4-6-6-4 locomotives, Norfolk and Western's design racked up unmatched records of performance in service.

Unlike diesel-electric locomotives of similar high tractive effort (for starting heavy trains) but typical for a steam locomotive, it could easily run at 70 miles per hour (113 km/h) and more.

History

Revenue service and preservation

No. 1218 was the ninth member of the second batch of fifteen class A locomotives (Nos. 1210–1224) built in June 1943 at the East End Shops in Roanoke, Virginia by the Norfolk and Western Railway (N&W). It was initially assigned to haul fast freight and heavy coal trains and even heavy passenger trains on the N&W's Scioto Division, between Williamson, West Virginia and Portsmouth and Columbus, Ohio, along with an occasional side trip to Cincinnati, Ohio. In the late 1950s, No. 1218 was later moved to the Norfolk Division, running between Roanoke and Norfolk, Virginia. At that time, the N&W planned to donate at least five steam locomotives for preservation, but with no plans to spare a class A locomotive from the scrap line.

In July 1959, No. 1218 was retired and purchased by the Union Carbide Co. in Charleston, West Virginia, where it used alongside its sister locomotives Nos. 1202 and 1230 as stationary boilers at a chemical plant in South Charleston, West Virginia. In 1964, Nos. 1202 and 1230 were scrapped, but No. 1218 was in fairly good condition as it was rescued by New England millionaire F. Nelson Blount for his private collection of steam locomotives at Steamtown, U.S.A. in Bellows Falls, Vermont a year later. Additionally, many of the parts on Nos. 1202 and 1232 such as the air pump, crosshead guide yokes, front side rods, and gauges were salvaged as donors for the No. 1218 locomotive.

In 1967, Blount died in an airplane crash, resulting in the Steamtown foundation running into financial trouble. As part of their effort to recoup their financial losses, the foundation put No. 1218 on a long-term lease to the Roanoke Transportation Museum, and the locomotive was cosmetically restored at the East End Shops in Roanoke, Virginia, the same place where the locomotive was built. Afterwards, it was put on display as a temporary exhibit at the Roanoke Transportation Museum in 1971.

Excursion service

In 1982, the N&W and Southern (SOU) railways were both merged to form the new Norfolk Southern Railway (NS). By the end of 1984, the NS steam program, which started in 1966 by the SOU needed a stronger and more powerful steam locomotive to pull the longer and heavier excursion trains along with assisting ex-N&W J Class No. 611, which was restored to operation since 1982. After some subsequent disputes took place, NS and the Steamtown foundation settled on a trade where the former acquired No. 1218, and the latter received two EMD diesel locomotives in return.

On May 10, 1985, the No. 1218 locomotive was towed out of the park and moved to the Norris Yard Steam Shop in Irondale, Alabama, where it would be restored to operating condition at a cost of roughly $500,000. On January 13, 1987, No. 1218 moved under its power for the first time in 28 years and was ready for main line excursion service for the NS steam program. During the Roanoke Chapter of the National Railway Historical Society (NRHS) convention in August 1987, No. 1218 pulled an empty 50-hopper car train, where it ran side by side with No. 611, who pulled an excursion passenger train from Roanoke to Radford, Virginia in which the former would double-headed with the latter for the return trip later on.

In July 1989, it performed a rare doubleheader excursion with Nickel Plate Road 587 from Salisbury to Asheville, North Carolina for the Asheville Chapter of the NRHS convention. In June 1990, No. 1218 traveled to Saint Louis, Missouri, where it met up with locomotives Cotton Belt 4-8-4 No. 819, Frisco 4-8-2 No. 1522, and Union Pacific 4-8-4 No. 844 to participate in another rare NRHS convention, which took place at the former Union Station.

On November 3, 1991, during Norfolk Southern's 25th Anniversary of their Steam Program, No. 1218 joined Southern Railway 4501 and N&W 611 to triple head a 28-car passenger excursion train from Chattanooga, Tennessee to Atlanta, Georgia. At Ooltewah, Tennessee, No. 4501 took a few coaches for a complete round trip, turning around at Cleveland, Tennessee. Afterwards, No. 611 and No. 1218 completed the rest of the trip to Atlanta.

Current disposition

At the end of the 1991 excursion season, after completing a round-trip excursion from Huntsville, Alabama to Chattanooga, Tennessee, No. 1218 returned to Irondale, Alabama for an extensive overhaul, where its flues need to be replaced and the portions of the firebox repaired. There were originally plans to have the 1218 running again for the beginning of the 1996 excursion season, but Norfolk Southern chairman David R. Goode cancelled the steam program in 1994 due to serious safety concerns, rising insurance costs, the expense of maintaining steam locomotives, a yard switching accident involving nine passenger cars in Lynchburg, Virginia, and decreasing rail network availability.

After the Norfolk Southern steam program was concluded, the No. 1218 locomotive was partially reassembled and towed back to Roanoke to be stored at the East End Shops in 1996, the year its overhaul was supposed to be completed. In 2001, the Norfolk Southern donated the 1218 to the City of Roanoke, clearing the way for the locomotive to once again be put on display at the Virginia Museum of Transportation (VMT), formerly known as the Roanoke Transportation Museum. After a cosmetic restoration by Norfolk Southern, the 1218 was towed to the Virginia Museum of Transportation on June 11, 2003, and pushed into place in its new home next to No. 611.

In 2007, the 1218 and 611 were both temporarily put on display at the East End Shops to commemorate its 125th anniversary. On April 2, 2012, the City of Roanoke officially donated both the 1218 and 611 to the VMT. The No. 1218 locomotive continues to sit on display underneath the VMT's Robert B. Claytor and W. Graham Claytor Jr. Pavilion shed, next to another former N&W steam locomotive, G-1 class No. 6, with the No. 611 locomotive restored to operating condition.

See also
Birmingham District
Norfolk and Western 433
Norfolk and Western 475
Norfolk and Western 611
Norfolk and Western 2156
Western Maryland Scenic Railroad 1309

References

Bibliography

Further reading

External links

Norfolk and Western Class A #1218 - Virginia Museum of Transportation

2-6-6-4 locomotives
Simple articulated locomotives
Historic American Engineering Record in Alabama
Individual locomotives of the United States
1218
Standard gauge locomotives of the United States
Freight locomotives
Railway locomotives introduced in 1943
Preserved steam locomotives of Virginia